Hinthada (formerly Henzada) is a city located on the Irrawaddy River in Ayeyarwady Region, Burma (Myanmar). In the 1983 census the city itself had a population of 82,005. By 2010 it had grown to 170,312. The trade of locally grown rice and grain goes through the port of Hinthada.

History
Historically, Hinthada was occupied by the Mon people (Talaings), and was part of the Pagan Empire.

Climate

Education
The city is home to University of Computer Studies, Hinthada and Hinthada University and Technological University, Hinthada.

Notable residents
 Mahn Ba Khaing
 Mahn Win Khaing Than

References

External links
 "Hinthata Organization", in Burmese

Populated places in Ayeyarwady Region
Township capitals of Myanmar